Hypochlora is a genus of spur-throated grasshoppers in the family Acrididae. There is at least one described species in Hypochlora, H. alba.

References

Further reading

 
 

Melanoplinae
Articles created by Qbugbot